North Lake is a civil parish in York County, New Brunswick, Canada.

For governance purposes it forms the local service district of the parish of North Lake, which is a member of the Western Valley Regional Service Commission (WVRSC).

Origin of name
The parish takes its name from the eponymous lake.

History
North Lake was erected in 1879 from Canterbury Parish.

Boundaries
North Lake Parish is bounded:

 on the north by the Carleton County line;
 on the east by a line running up Eel River, including First Eel Lake, Second Eel Lake, and Third Eel Lake, then east-southeasterly across land to La Coote Lake, then down La Coote Lake and Big La Coote Stream to the northern end of Palfrey Lake;
 on the southeast by a line running southwesterly from the southeastern corner of a grant to Abraham Lint west of Allandale Road near the Saint John River to a point west of Sandy Point on Spednic Lake, paralleling the southeastern lines of other parishes south of the Saint John River;
 on the west by the international border, running up Spednic Lake, Grand Lake, the North Lake Thoroughfare, North Lake, and Monument Brook to the Carleton County line.

Communities
Communities at least partly within the parish.

 Forest City
 Fosterville
 Graham Corner
 Green Mountain

 Maxwell
 North Lake
 Pemberton Ridge

Bodies of water
Bodies of water at least partly within the parish. italics indicate a name no longer in official use

 Eel River
 Big La Coote Stream
 Mud Lake Stream
  Bolton Lake
 more than a dozen other officially named lakes

 Chiputneticook Lakes
  Grand Lake
 Mud Lake (Azesko Lake)
 North Lake
 North Lake Thoroughfare
 Spednic Lake

Islands
Islands at least partly within the parish.
 Frog Island
 Pine Island

Other notable places
Parks, historic sites, and other noteworthy places at least partly within the parish.
 First Eel Lake Protected Natural Area
 Hay Brook Protected Natural Area
 Maxwell Protected Natural Area
 Monument Brook Protected Natural Area
 North Lake Protected Natural Area
 Spednic Lake Protected Natural Area
 Tamarack Brook Protected Natural Area

Demographics

Population
Population trend

Language
Mother tongue (2016)

See also
List of parishes in New Brunswick

Notes

References

Parishes of York County, New Brunswick
Local service districts of York County, New Brunswick